Petrus Bernardus Beukers (9 October 1899 in Amsterdam – 12 April 1981 in Schaijk) was a sailor from the Netherlands, who represented his native country at the 1920 Summer Olympics in Ostend, Belgium.

During the second race one of the marks was drifting and the race was abandoned. Since the organizers did not have the time to re-sail the race that week the two remaining races were rescheduled for 3 September of that year. Since both contenders were Dutch, the organizers requested the Dutch Olympic Committee to organize the race in The Netherlands.

With Arnoud van der Biesen as helmsman, Beukers took the silver over the combined series with the boat Boreas.

References

Sources

 

1899 births
1981 deaths
Sportspeople from Amsterdam
Dutch male sailors (sport)

Sailors at the 1920 Summer Olympics – 12' Dinghy
Olympic sailors of the Netherlands
Medalists at the 1920 Summer Olympics
Olympic medalists in sailing
Olympic silver medalists for the Netherlands